The 1989 Philippine Basketball Association (PBA) All-Filipino Conference (also known as the 1989 PBA Fiesta All-Filipino Conference) was the second conference of the 1989 PBA season. It started on June 18 and ended on September 3, 1989. The tournament is an All-Filipino format, which doesn't require an import or a pure-foreign player for each team.

The Philippine national team, bound for SEA Games and ABC championships, participated as guest team, playing only in the first round of the eliminations and went winless in all their six games against PBA ballclubs.

Format
The following format will be observed for the duration of the conference:
 Double-round robin eliminations; 11 games per team; Teams are then seeded by basis on win–loss records.
 Teams with the worst record after the elimination round will be eliminated. 
 Semifinals will be two round robin affairs with the five remaining teams. Results from the elimination round will be carried over.
 The top two teams in the semifinals advance to the best-of-seven finals. The last two teams dispute the third-place trophy in a best-of-five playoff.

Elimination round

Semifinals

Cumulative standings

Semifinal round standings:

Third place playoffs

Finals

References

PBA Philippine Cup
All-Filipino Conference